Drinking Solo is a South Korean drama starring Ha Seok-jin and Park Ha-sun. It aired on the cable network tvN for 16 episodes from September 5 to October 25, 2016.

Plot
This drama is about the slice-of-life and daily activities around the teachers, students, staffs of a private institution that prepares for civil service exam around the area of Seoul's Noryangjin. The characters like to drink alone after work for their own reasons. The story also depicts the romance between Jin Jung-suk and Park Ha-na. Jin Jung Suk (Ha Seok-jin) is a good looking and professional star lecturer. Meanwhile, Park Ha-na (Park Ha-sun) is a rookie lecturer who struggles to survive in the private institute world.

Cast

Main cast 
 Ha Seok-jin as Jin Jung-suk (Jin-sang) 
 Park Ha-sun as Park Ha-na

Noryangjin Institute's teachers 
 Hwang Woo-seul-hye as Hwang Jin-yi 
 Min Jin-woong as Min Jin-woong
 Kim Won-hae as Kim Won-hae

Noryangjin Institute's 9th grade civil service students 
 Gong Myung as Jin Gong-myung
 Key as Kim Ki-bum
 Jung Chae-yeon as Jung Chae-yeon
 Kim Dong-young as Kim Dong-young

Guest appearances 
 Ha Yeon-soo as Hwang Joo-yeon (Kim Dong-young's girlfriend) (ep. 1, 2 & 16)
 Kim Hee-won as Jin Jung-suk's former school director (ep. 1)
 Choi Min-ho as Minho from Shinee (Kim Ki-bum's high school classmate) (ep. 5)
 Jeon So-min as Kim Won-hae's sister-in-law and Jin Jung-suk's blind date partner (ep.10)
 Jo Kwon as Kwon (fellow student at Noryangjin) (ep. 11)
 Jang Do-yeon as Seo Do yeon (Korean Professor) (ep. 12)
 Kim Ji-seok as guy at the club named Jin-sang (ep. 13)
 Jang Woo-hyuk a guy at the club (ep. 13)
 Lee Se-young as class alumni (ep. 14) 
 DIA (ep. 15)
 Lee Tae-kyung as graduate from class #3 (ep. 14)
 Kim Hyun-mok as College student
 Lee Yong-yi Min Jin-woong's mother, Kim Mi-kyung

Original soundtrack

Part 1

Part 2

Part 3

Part 4

Part 5

Part 6

Background Music

Ratings
In this table, the  represent the lowest ratings and the  represent the highest.

Awards and nominations

Production 
First script reading took place June 28, 2016 at CJ E&M Center in Sangam-dong, Seoul, South Korea.

International broadcast

References

External links

TVN (South Korean TV channel) television dramas
Korean-language television shows
2016 South Korean television series debuts
2016 South Korean television series endings
South Korean romantic comedy television series
South Korean cooking television series
Television shows set in Seoul
Television series about alcohol
Television series produced in Seoul
Television series about educators
Examinations and testing in fiction
Television series by CJ E&M